Alexander Alan Righton (1905–1982) was an Australian rugby league footballer who played in the 1920s and 1930s.

Background
Righton was born in Redfern, New South Wales on 18 February 1905.

Playing career
Righton went on to become one of South Sydney Rabbitohs greatest fullbacks, and a premiership winner.  Righton was a South's junior, and made his first grade debut in 1925. 

He went on to play seven seasons with South Sydney between 1925 and 1931, and played in three premiership winning teams in 1925,1926 and 1928. He represented N.S.W. City Firsts in 1929 and played for New South Wales on one occasion in 1927. 

He later switched to Newtown and played three seasons with them between 1933 and 1935 before retiring.

Righton died on 11 June 1982, aged 77.

References

1905 births
1982 deaths
Australian rugby league players
South Sydney Rabbitohs players
Newtown Jets players
New South Wales rugby league team players
Rugby league players from Sydney